Enkhelyawon (Mycenaean Greek: , e-ke-rja-wo) was possibly a Mycenaean king from Pylos in the 13th century BCE.

Enkhelyawon is known from Linear B records from Pylos. He was very important and owned great estates, including good farm land, a thousand grapevines and a thousand fig trees; he also had forty men serving as rowers in the fleet. Because of this it is assumed that he was a king - Mycenaean Greek: wanax; Linear B: , wa-na-ka; later Greek: , anax - and that he ruled over Pylos. But as kings are only mentioned by their title in texts of Linear B, it is not possible to conclusively prove this theory.

See also
 Palace of Nestor

Notes and references
Notes

References

Sources 
 

Ancient Messenians
History of Pylos
European kings
Mycenaean Greeks
13th-century BC rulers
12th-century BC rulers